The Embassy of Kyrgyzstan in Washington, D.C. is the diplomatic mission of The Kyrgyz Republic to the United States and to Canada. It is located at 2360 Massachusetts Avenue, Northwest, Washington, D.C., in the Embassy Row neighborhood.

The Ambassador is Bakyt Amanbaev.

References

External links

Embassy of the Kyrgyz Republic to the USA and Canada
wikimapia

Kyrgyzstan
Washington, D.C.
Kyrgyzstan–United States relations
Kyrgyzstan